House at 9 North Front Street is a historic home located in the Jonestown Historic District in Baltimore, Maryland, United States. It is a -story brick townhouse with a 2-story rear wing.  It is three bays wide and two rooms deep.  The main house features a gable roof with two dormers on each side and two interior chimneys connected by a parapet.  The house is located at 9 North Front Street and was built by either John Beale Bordley or Charles Torrence circa 1790. The house was the residence of Thorowgood Smith, second Mayor of Baltimore (1804-1808). It rests on an area of downtown Baltimore traditionally known as “Old Town”. Even earlier on, it was known as “Jones Town”. This area was annexed to Baltimore in 1745 and its settlement predates that of Baltimore Town. More specifically, the house is located in a neighborhood known today as Shot Tower Park. Once part of a whole row of Conservative Conservative Georgian style brick masonry -story townhomes, this house is the last extant example on the street, and one of just a few 18th century townhouses remaining in all of Baltimore.

The House at 9 North Front Street was listed on the National Register of Historic Places in 1979.

References

External links

, including undated photo, at Maryland Historical Trust

Houses on the National Register of Historic Places in Baltimore
Houses in Baltimore
Houses completed in 1804
Jonestown, Baltimore
1804 establishments in Maryland